A guitar amplifier (or amp) is an electronic device or system that strengthens the electrical signal from a pickup on an electric guitar, bass guitar, or acoustic guitar so that it can produce sound through one or more loudspeakers, which are typically housed in a wooden cabinet. A guitar amplifier may be a standalone wood or metal cabinet that contains only the power amplifier (and preamplifier) circuits, requiring the use of a separate speaker cabinet–or it may be a "combo" amplifier, which contains both the amplifier and one or more speakers in a wooden cabinet. There is a wide range of sizes and power ratings for guitar amplifiers, from small, lightweight "practice amplifiers" with a single 6-inch speaker and a 10-watt amp to heavy combo amps with four 10-inch or four 12-inch speakers and a 100-watt amplifier, which are loud enough to use in a nightclub or bar performance.

Guitar amplifiers can also modify an instrument's tone by emphasizing or de-emphasizing certain frequencies, using equalizer controls, which function the same way as the bass and treble knobs on a home stereo, and by adding electronic effects;  distortion (also called "overdrive") and reverb are commonly available as built-in features. The input of modern guitar amplifiers is a 1/4" jack, which is fed a signal from an electro-magnetic pickup (from an electric guitar) or a piezoelectric pickup (usually from an acoustic guitar) using a patch cord, or a wireless transmitter. For electric guitar players, their choice of amp and the settings they use on the amplifier are a key part of their signature tone or sound. Some guitar players are longtime users of a specific amp brand or model. Guitarists may also use external effects pedals to alter the sound of their tone before the signal reaches the amplifier.

History

In the 1920s, it was very hard for a musician playing a pickup-equipped guitar to find an amplifier and speaker to make their instrument louder as the only speakers that could be bought were "radio horns of limited frequency range and low acoustic output". The cone speaker, widely used in 2000s-era amp cabinets, was not widely offered for sale until the 1930s and beyond. The first amplifiers and speakers could only be powered with large batteries, which made them heavy and hard to carry around. When engineers developed the first AC mains-powered amplifiers, they were soon used to make musical instruments louder.

Engineers invented the first loud, powerful amplifier and speaker systems for public address systems and movie theaters. These PA systems and movie theatre sound systems were very large and very expensive, and so they could not be used by most touring musicians. After 1927, smaller, portable AC mains-powered PA systems that could be plugged into a regular wall socket "quickly became popular with musicians"; indeed, "...Leon McAuliffe (with Bob Wills) still used a carbon mic and a portable PA as late as 1935." During the late 1920s to mid-1930s, small portable PA systems and guitar combo amplifiers were fairly similar. These early amps had a "single volume control and one or two input jacks, field coil speakers" and thin wooden cabinets; remarkably, these early amps did not have tone controls or even an on-off switch.

In 1928, the Stromberg-Voisinet firm marketed an electric stringed instrument and amplifier package. There are no records as to how many—if any—of the amps were ever built and sold, beyond marketing materials. Stromberg-Voisinet still launched a new idea: a portable electric instrument amp with a speaker, all in a transportable wooden cabinet. In 1929, Vega electrics launched a portable banjo amplifier. In 1932, Electro String Instruments and amplifier (this is not the same company as Stromberg Electro Instruments) introduced a guitar amp with "high output" and a "string driven magnetic pickup". Electro set out the standard template for combo amps: a wooden cabinet with the electronic amplifier mounted inside, and convenient carrying handles to facilitate transporting the cabinet. In 1933, Vivi-Tone amp set-ups were used for live performances and radio shows. In 1934, Rickenbacker launched a similar combo amp that added metal corner protectors to keep the corners in good condition during transportation.

In 1933, Dobro released an electric guitar and amp package. The combo amp had "two 8″ Lansing speakers and a five-tube chassis. Dobro made a two speaker combo amp that was on the market over 12 years before Fender launched its two-speaker "Dual Professional/Super" combo amp. In 1933, Audio-Vox was founded by Paul Tutmarc, the inventor of the first electric bass (Tutmarc's instrument did not achieve market success until Leo Fender's launched the Precision Bass). In 1933, Vega sold a pickup and amplifier set for musicians to use with existing guitars.

In that same year, the Los Angeles-based Volu-Tone company also sold a pickup/amplifier set. Volu-Tone used "high voltage current" to sense the string vibration, a potentially dangerous approach that did not become popular. In 1934 Dobro released a guitar amp with a vacuum tube rectifier and two power tubes. By 1935, Dobro and National began selling combo amps for Hawaiian guitar. In 1934, Gibson had developed prototype combo amps, but never released them. By 1935, Electro/Rickenbacher had sold more amps and electric guitars than all the amps and electrified or electric guitars that had been made from 1928 through the end of 1934.

The first electric instrument amplifiers were not intended for electric guitars, but were portable PA systems. These appeared in the early 1930s when the introduction of electrolytic capacitors and rectifier tubes enabled economical built-in power supplies that could plug into wall sockets. Previously, amplifiers required heavy multiple battery packs. People used these amplifiers to amplify acoustic guitar, but electronic amplification of guitar first became widely popular in the 1930s and 1940s craze for Western Swing and Hawaiian music, which extensively used amplified lap steel guitars. In fact, the very first recording of an electrically amplified string instrument was the September 1933 recordings of Milton Brown and his Musical Brownies, featuring steel guitarist Bob Dunn

In the 1920s, the earliest combo amplifiers had no tone controls. The first tone controls were simple, mainly providing treble adjustment. The limited controls, the early loudspeakers, and the low amplifier power (typically 15 watts or less before the mid-1950s) gave poor high treble and bass output. Some models also provided effects such as an electronic tremolo unit. In confusion over nomenclature, Fender labeled early amplifier tremolo as "vibrato" and called the vibrato arm of the Stratocaster guitar a "tremolo bar" (see vibrato unit, electric guitar, and tremolo).

Some later amplifier models included an onboard spring reverb effect, one of the first being the Ampeg Reverberocket amp.

In the 1950s, several guitarists experimented with producing distortion by deliberately overdriving amplifiers. These included Goree Carter, Joe Hill Louis, Elmore James, Ike Turner, Willie Johnson, Pat Hare, Guitar Slim, Chuck Berry, Johnny Burnette, and Link Wray. In the early 1960s, surf rock guitarist Dick Dale worked closely with Fender to produce custom made amplifiers, including the first 100-watt guitar amplifier. He pushed the limits of electric amplification technology, helping to develop new equipment that was capable of producing "thick, clearly defined tones" at "previously undreamed-of volumes."

Distortion became more popular from the mid-1960s, when The Kinks guitarist Dave Davies produced distortion effects by connecting the already distorted output of one amplifier into the input of another. Later, most guitar amps were provided with preamplifier distortion controls, and "fuzz boxes" and other effects units were engineered to safely and reliably produce these sounds. In the 2000s, overdrive and distortion have become an integral part of many styles of electric guitar playing, ranging from blues rock to heavy metal and hardcore punk.

Guitar combo amplifiers were at first used with bass guitars and electric pianos, but these instruments produce a wider frequency range and need a full-range speaker system. Much more amplifier power is required to reproduce low-frequency sound, especially at high volume. Reproducing low frequencies also requires a suitable woofer or subwoofer speaker and enclosure, with bass cabinets often being larger than a cabinet for mid-range or high-range sounds. As well, the open-back cabinets used on many electric guitar amps, while effective for electric guitar, do not have good bass reproduction.

Woofer enclosures must be larger and more sturdily built than cabinets for mid-range or high-frequency (tweeter) speakers. As such, in the 1950s, when Ampeg introduced bass amplifier and speaker systems, bass guitarists began to use them. Similarly, Hammond organ players used a specialized keyboard combo amplifier, the Leslie speaker cabinet, which contains a woofer for the low frequencies and a horn for the high frequencies. The Leslie horns rotate and a baffle around the woofer rotates as well, producing a rich tremolo and chorus effect.

Structure

Typically, guitar amplifiers have two amplifying circuit stages, and frequently have tone-shaping electric circuits, which usually include at least bass and treble controls, which function similarly to the equivalent controls on a home hi-fi system. More expensive amplifiers typically have more controls for other frequency ranges, such as one or two "midrange" controls and a "presence" control for high frequencies. Some guitar amplifiers have a graphic equalizer, which uses vertical faders to control multiple frequency bands. Some more expensive bass amps have a parametric equalizer, which enables precise control of tone.

The first amplifier stage is a preamplifier. It amplifies the audio signal to a level that can drive the power stage. The preamplifier also changes the tone of the signal; high preamp settings add overdrive. The power amplifier produces a high current signal to drive a loudspeaker and produce sound.

Various types of tone stages may affect the guitar signal:
 Settings on the guitar itself (passive tone controls, active equalizer circuits in built-in preamps, pickup selector switch position, etc.)
 Devices between the guitar and the preamp stage, such as a wah-wah pedal or other effects units, such as chorus or reverb.
 Between the preamp and power stages (an effects loop or some dedicated amplifier tone circuits)
 Between multiple stacked preamp stages (also called “gain stages”)
 In feedback loops from a post-preamp signal to an earlier pre-preamp signal (as in the case of presence modifier circuits)

Tone stages may also provide electronic effects—such as equalization, compression, distortion, chorus, or reverb. Amplifiers may use vacuum tubes (called valves in Britain), solid-state (transistor) devices, or both.

The two common guitar amplifier configurations are a combination ("combo") amplifier that includes an amplifier and one or more speakers in a single cabinet, and a standalone amplifier (often called a "head" or "amp head"), which passes the amplified signal via a speaker cable to one or more external speaker cabinets. A wide range of speaker configurations are available in guitar cabinets—from cabinets with a single speaker (e.g., 1×10" or 1×12") or multiple speakers (e.g., 2×10", 4×10" or 8x10").

Guitar amplifiers vary widely in price and quality. Many music equipment companies import small, low-powered practice amplifiers for students and beginners that sell for less than $50. Other companies produce expensive custom-made amplifiers for professional musicians, which can cost hundreds or even thousands of dollars (USD). Most combo amplifiers have a carrying handle, and many combo amplifiers and cabinets have metal or plastic-reinforced corners to protect the amp during transportation.

Control knobs and buttons are typically on the front of the cabinet or chassis, though in some cases, the knobs are on a recessed panel at the back of the top of the amplifier. The most basic amps only have a few knobs, which typically control volume, bass, and treble. More expensive amps may have several knobs that control pre-amp volume (or "gain"), distortion or overdrive, volume, bass, mid and treble, and reverb. Some older amps (and their re-issued versions) have a knob that controls a vibrato or tremolo effect. The 1/4" input jack is typically mounted on the front of the amplifier. In the simplest, least expensive amplifiers, this 1/4" jack is the only jack on the amplifier.

More expensive amplifiers may have a patch bay for multiple inputs and outputs, such as a pre-amp out (for sending to another guitar amplifier), a second low gain input, to use with active basses, an in jack to create an effects loop (when used with the pre-amp out jack), an external speaker output (for powering an additional speaker cabinet), and stereo RCA jacks or a 1/8" jack, for connecting a CD player or MP3 player so that a player can practice along with recorded music. Some amps have a 1/4" jack for connecting a pedal to turn the amp's onboard overdrive and reverb on and off or to switch between channels. Some amps have an XLR jack for a microphone, either for the guitar amp to be used for singing (in effect as a mini-PA system), or, for acoustic guitar, to mix a mic signal with a pickup signal.

The vast majority of guitar amps can only be powered by AC mains power (plugging into a wall outlet); however, a small number of practice amps are designed for buskers also have battery power so they can be used for street performances.

Types

A combo amp contains the amplifier and one or more speakers in a single cabinet. In a "head and speaker cabinet" configuration, the amplifier and speaker each have their own cabinet. The amplifier (head) may drive one or more speaker cabinets.

In the 1920s, guitarists played through public address amplifiers, but by the 1940s this was uncommon.

Besides instrument inputs and speaker outputs (typically via 1/4" jacks), an amp may have other inputs and outputs. These can include an auxiliary input jack (sometimes with its own level control, for a drum machine), "send" and "return" jacks to create an effects loop, a “line out” jack, and an extension speaker jack. Practice amps sometimes have a 1/4" headphone jack, or stereo RCA or mini jacks for connecting a CD player, portable media player or other sound sources. Some guitar amps have an XLR input so that a microphone can be plugged in for singing. Guitar amps that include a mic input are in effect small, portable PA systems. Some amps, typically bass amps, have an XLR connector to provide a balanced output from the preamp section to a PA system or recording input.

Instrument amplifiers are available in a wide range of price, quality, and performance levels. Some are designed for beginners, such as small, low-wattage practice amps, which typically have a single 8" speaker and about 10 watts, or smaller "combo" amps with relatively low wattage (15 to 20 watts) and a single 10" speaker. Mid- to large-size "combo" amps with 30 to 50 watts and one 12" speaker or four 10" speakers are best for high-volume situations, such as band rehearsals and onstage performances. For large venues, such as outdoor music festivals, guitarists may use one or more 100 watts (or several hundred watts) heads with one or more 8x10” cabinets.

Vacuum tube 

Vacuum tubes (called "valves" in British English) were by far the dominant active electronic components in most instrument amplifier applications until the 1970s when solid-state semiconductors (transistors) started taking over. Transistor amplifiers are less expensive to build and maintain, reduce the weight and heat of an amplifier, and tend to be more reliable and more shock-resistant. Tubes are fragile and they must be replaced and maintained periodically. As well, serious problems with the tubes can render an amplifier inoperable until the issue is resolved.

While tube-based circuitry is technologically outdated, tube amps remain popular since many guitarists prefer their sound. Tube enthusiasts believe that tube amps produce a "warmer" sound and a more natural "overdrive" sound.

Solid-state 

Most inexpensive and mid-priced guitar amplifiers are based on transistor or semiconductor (solid-state) circuits, which are cheaper to produce and more reliable, and usually much lighter than tube amplifiers. Solid-state amps are less fragile than tube amps.

High-end solid-state amplifiers are less common, since many professional guitarists favor vacuum tubes. Some jazz guitarists favor the "cleaner" sound of solid-state amplifiers. Only a few solid-state amps have enduring attraction, such as the Roland Jazz Chorus. Solid-state amplifiers vary in output power, functionality, size, price, and sound quality in a wide range, from practice amplifiers to combos suitable for gigging to professional models intended for session musicians who do studio recording work.

Hybrid
A hybrid amplifier involves one of two combinations of tube and solid-state amplification. It may have a tube power amp fed by a solid-state pre-amp circuit, as in most of the original MusicMan amplifiers.

Alternatively, a tube preamplifier can feed a solid-state output stage, as in models from Kustom, Hartke, SWR, and Vox. This approach dispenses with the need for an output transformer and easily achieves modern power levels.

Modeling

Microprocessor technology allows the use of digital onboard effects in guitar amps to create numerous different sounds and tones that simulate the sound of a range of tube amplifiers and different sized speaker cabinets, all using the same amplifier and speaker. These are known as modeling amplifiers, and can be programmed with simulated characteristic tones of different existing amplifier models (and speaker cabinets—even microphone type or placement), or dialed in to the user's taste. Many amps of this type are also programmable by way of USB connection to a home computer or laptop. Line 6 is generally credited with bringing modeling amplification to the market. Modeling amplifiers and stompbox pedals, rackmount units, and software that models specific amplifiers, speakers cabinets, and microphones can provide a large number of sounds and tones. Players can get a reasonable facsimile of the sound of tube amplifiers, vintage combo amplifiers, and huge 8x10” speaker stacks without bringing all that heavy equipment to the studio or stage.

The use of "full range, flat response" (FRFR) amplification systems by electric guitarists has received an extra impetus from modeling amplifiers. Before widespread availability of modeling, guitarists did not commonly plug electric guitars straight into PA systems or powered speakers because most genres relied on the tonal coloration of a regular guitar amplifier setup—from the preamplifier, equalization filters, power amp, guitar speakers, and cabinet design. The FRFR approach assumes the tone is shaped by sound processors in the signal chain before the amplifier and speaker stage, so it strives to not add further coloration or dedicated combo-style amplifiers with a broad frequency range. Such processors can be traditional guitar effects, a modeling amplifier (without power amplifier), or a computer running tone-shaping software. Using a modeling amp or a multi-effects pedal used with line level output, a guitarist can plug in the guitar into a flat response mic input or into a keyboard amplifier.

Acoustic 
Acoustic amplifiers are intended for acoustic guitars and other acoustic instruments, especially for the way these instruments are used in relatively quiet genres such as folk and bluegrass. They are similar to keyboard amplifiers, in that they have a relatively flat frequency response with minimal coloration. To produce this relatively "clean" sound, these amplifiers often have powerful amplifiers (providing up to 800 watts RMS), to provide additional "Headroom" and prevent unwanted distortion. Since an 800 watt amplifier built with standard Class AB technology is heavy, some acoustic amplifier manufacturers use lightweight Class D amplifiers, which are also called "switching amplifiers."

Acoustic amplifiers produce an uncolored, "acoustic" sound when used with acoustic instruments with built-in transducer pickups or microphones. The amplifiers often come with a simple mixer, so that the signals from a pickup and condenser microphone can be blended. Since the early 2000s, it has become increasingly common for acoustic amplifiers to provide a range of digital effects, such as reverb and compression. As well, these amplifiers often contain feedback-suppressing devices, such as notch filters or parametric equalizers.

Stacks

An amplifier stack consists of an amplifier head atop a speaker cabinet—a head on top of one cabinet is commonly called a half stack, a head atop two cabinets a full-stack. The cabinet that the head sits on often has an angled top in front, while the lower cabinet of a full stack has a straight front. The first version of the Marshall stack was an amp head on an 8×12 cabinet, meaning a single speaker cabinet containing eight 12" guitar speakers. After six of these cabinets were made, the cabinet arrangement was changed to an amp head on two 4×12 (four 12" speakers) cabinets to make the cabinets more transportable. Some touring metal and rock bands have used a large array of guitar speaker cabinets for their impressive appearance. Some of these arrangements include only the fronts of speaker cabinets mounted on a large frame.

There are many varieties of speaker combinations used in guitar speaker cabinets, including one 12" speaker, one 15" speaker (this is more common for bass amplifiers than for electric guitar cabinets), two 10" speakers, four 10" speakers, four 12" speakers, or eight 10" speakers. Less commonly, guitar cabinets may contain different sizes of speakers in the same cabinet. Cabinets with eight 10" speakers are large and heavy, and they are often equipped with wheels and a "towel bar"-style handle for transport. Some cabinets use mixed speaker types, such as one 15" speaker and two 10" speakers.

Cabinet design
Combo guitar amplifier cabinets and guitar speaker cabinets use several different designs, including the "open back" cabinet, the closed back cabinet (a sealed box), and, less commonly, bass reflex designs, which use a closed back with a vent or port cut into the cabinet. With guitar amps, most "open back" amp cabinets are not fully open; part of the back is enclosed with panels. Combo guitar amp cabinets and standalone speaker cabinets are often made of plywood. Some are made of MDF or particle board—especially in low-budget models. Cabinet size and depth, material types, assembly methods, type and thickness of the baffle material (the wood panel that holds the speaker), and the way the baffle attaches to the cabinet all affect tone.

When two or more speakers are used in the same cabinet, or when two cabinets are used together, the speakers can be wired in parallel or in series, or in a combination of the two (e.g., two 2x10" cabinets, with the two speakers wired in series, can be connected together in parallel). Whether speakers are wired in parallel or in series affects the impedance of the system. Two 8 ohm speakers wired in parallel have 4-ohm impedance. Guitarists who connect multiple cabinets to an amplifier must consider the amp's minimum impedance. Parallel vs. series also affects tone and sound. Speakers wired in parallel slightly dampen[s] and restrain[s] them, giving what some describe as "tighter response" and "smoother breakup". Some describe speakers wired in series (usually no more than two) as sounding "...looser, giving a slightly more raw, open and edgy sound."

Distortion, power, and volume

Power output

The relationship between power output in watts and perceived volume is not immediately obvious. The human ear perceives a 5-watt amplifier as half as loud as a 50-watt amplifier (a tenfold increase in power), and a half-watt amplifier is a quarter as loud as a 50-watt amp. Doubling the output power of an amplifier results in a "just noticeable" increase in volume, so a 100-watt amplifier is only just noticeably louder than a 50-watt amplifier. Such generalizations are also subject to the human ear's tendency to behave as a natural compressor at high volumes.

Power attenuation can be used with either low-power or high-power amplifiers, resulting in variable-power amplifiers. A high-power amplifier with power attenuation can produce power-tube distortion through a range of listening volumes, but with a decrease in high power distortion. Other technologies, such as dual rectifiers and the sag circuit—which should not be confused with attenuation—allow high power amplifiers to produce low power volume while preserving high power distortion.

Speaker efficiency is also a major factor affecting a tube amplifier's maximum volume.

For bass instruments, higher-power amplifiers are needed to reproduce low-frequency sounds. While an electric guitarist would be able to play at a small club with a 50-watt amplifier, a bass player performing in the same venue would probably need an amplifier with 200 or more watts.

Distortion and volume

Distortion is a feature available on many guitar amplifiers that is not typically found on keyboard or bass guitar amplifiers. Tube guitar amplifiers can produce distortion through pre-distortion equalization, preamp tube distortion, post-distortion EQ, power-tube distortion, tube rectifier compression, output transformer distortion, guitar speaker distortion, and guitar speaker and cabinet frequency response. Because many factors beyond preamp distortion contribute to a particular guitarist's sound, recording engineers and PA system techs typically put a microphone in front of the guitar speaker, rather than only use the guitar amp's pre-amp out signal.  A sound engineer or music producer may send the DI out signal from the pickups to a separate track at the same time, so they can re-amp the signal later. In contrast, it is fairly common to use a DI box with electric bass.

Distortion sound or "texture" from guitar amplifiers is further shaped or processed through the frequency response and distortion factors in the microphones (their response, placement, and multi-microphone comb filtering effects), microphone preamps, mixer channel equalization, and compression.  Additionally, the basic sound produced by the guitar amplifier can be changed and shaped by adding distortion and/or equalization effect pedals before the amp's input jack, in the effects loop just before the tube power amp, or after the power tubes.

Power-tube distortion
Power-tube distortion is required for amp sounds in some genres. In a standard master-volume guitar amp, as the amp's final or master volume is increased beyond the full power of the amplifier, power-tube distortion is produced. The "power soak" approach places the attenuation between the power tubes and the guitar speaker. In the re-amped or "dummy load" approach, the tube power amp drives a mostly resistive dummy load while an additional low power amp drives the guitar speaker. In the isolation box approach, the guitar amplifier is used with a guitar speaker in a separate cabinet. A soundproofed isolation cabinet, isolation box, isolation booth, or isolation room can be used.

Volume controls

A variety of labels are used for level attenuation potentiometers (knobs) in a guitar amplifier and other guitar equipment. Electric guitars and basses have a volume control on the instrument that attenuates the signal from selected pickups. There may be two volume controls on an electric guitar or bass, wired in parallel to mix the signal levels from the neck and bridge pickups. Rolling back the guitar's volume control also changes the pickup's equalization or frequency response, which can provide pre-distortion equalization.

The simplest guitar amplifiers, such as some vintage amps and modern practice amps, have only a single volume control. Most have two volume controls: a first volume control called "preamplifier" or "gain" and a master volume control. The preamp or gain control works differently on different guitar amp designs. On an amp designed for acoustic guitar, turning up the preamp knob pre-amplifies the signal—but even at its maximum setting, the preamp control is unlikely to produce much overdrive. However, with amps designed for electric guitarists playing blues, hard rock and heavy metal music, turning up the preamp or gain knob usually produces overdrive distortion. Some electric guitar amps have three controls in the volume section: pre-amplifier, distortion, and master control. Turning up the preamp and distortion knobs in varying combinations can create a range of overdrive tones, from a gentle, warm growling overdrive suitable for a traditional blues show or a rockabilly band to the extreme distortion used in hardcore punk and death metal. On some electric guitar amps, the "gain" knob is equivalent to the distortion control on a distortion pedal and similarly may have a side-effect of changing the proportion of bass and treble sent to the next stage.

A simple, inexpensive amplifier may have only two tone controls, a passive bass and treble control. In some better quality amps, one or more midrange controls are provided. On the most expensive amps, there may be shelving equalizers for bass and treble, several mid-range controls (e.g., low mid, mid, and high mid), and a graphic equalizer or parametric equalizer.  The amplifier's master volume control restricts the amount of signal permitted through to the driver stage and the power amplifier.  When using a power attenuator with a tube amplifier, the master volume no longer acts as the master volume control. Instead, the power attenuator's attenuation control controls the power delivered to the speaker, and the amplifier's master volume control determines the amount of power-tube distortion. Power-supply based power reduction is controlled by a knob on the tube power amp, variously labeled "wattage", "power", "scale", "power scale", or "power dampening".

In popular culture

Volume control gradations are typically numbered from zero to ten. In the 1984 film This Is Spinal Tap, guitarist Nigel Tufnel demonstrates an amplifier whose volume knobs are marked from zero to eleven, believing that this numbering increases the highest volume of the amp. He explains, "It's one louder, isn't it?" This misunderstanding of the underlying operating principles led to the idiom "Up to eleven", also phrased as "These go to eleven". As a consequence of the film, real bands and musicians started buying equipment whose knobs went up to eleven.

See also
:Category:Guitar amplifier manufacturers
Vintage musical equipment
Tube sound
Bass amplifier

References

Further reading
 Fliegler, Ritchie. The Complete Guide to Guitar and Amp Maintenance. Hal Leonard Corporation, 1994.
 Fliegler, Ritchie and Eiche, Jon F. Amps!: The Other Half of Rock 'n' Roll. Hal Leonard Corporation, 1993.
 Hunter, Dave. Amped: The Illustrated History of the World's Greatest Amplifiers. Voyageur Press, 2012.
 Pittman, Aspen. The Tube Amp Book. Backbeat, 2003.
 Tarquin, Brian. Guitar Amplifier Encyclopedia. Skyhorse Publishing, Inc., 2016.
 Weber, Gerald, "A Desktop Reference of Hip Vintage Guitar Amps", Hal Leonard Corporation, 1994.

External links
 
Lenard Audio History of Guitar Amplifiers (non-profit educational website)
Amplifiers: What do all the controls do?
Vintage Guitar magazine article on vintage amps

Instrument amplifiers
 01
Electric guitars
Blues instruments
Rock music instruments
Folk music instruments
Jazz instruments